Latonia is a genus of frogs in the family Alytidae (formerly Discoglossidae). It contains only one extant species, the Hula painted frog which is endemic to Israel and was originally classified in the genus Discoglossus, though several fossil species are known from the Paleogene and Neogene periods (Upper Oligocene to Early Pleistocene) in Europe.

Species

References

Painted frogs
Extant Chattian first appearances
Taxa named by Christian Erich Hermann von Meyer
Amphibian genera